Adam Jakubech (born 2 January 1997) is a Slovak professional footballer who plays as a goalkeeper for Ligue 1 club Lille.

Club career

Spartak Trnava
Jakubech signed for Spartak Trnava in January 2015. In 2015, he usually played in II. liga for the reserves squad, being featured in a total of 17 games. In the second to last round of the 2014–15 season, he managed to debut for Spartak's senior team, when he played against Dukla Banská Bystrica on 23 May 2015 under Juraj Jarábek. Spartak won the home fixture at Štadión Antona Malatinského 3–1. Jakubech lost the clean sheet by a 90th-minute goal from Jozef Rejdovian.

In the two subsequent seasons he recorded 47 starts for Spartak in the Fortuna liga. By the 2016–17 season, Jakubech was Spartak's uncontested preferred goalkeeper.

During the summer of 2017, it was announced that Lille had shown interest in Jakubech. In the 2017–18 season, he was only featured in a first round match against Zemplín Michalovce. Spartak won the game 1–0, thanks to an early goal by Štefan Pekár. The squad of Serbian-born British coach Nestor El Maestro went on to win Spartak's first title in 45 years that season, with Martin Vantruba replacing Jakubech and winning himself a transfer to Slavia Prague after the season.

Lille
Jakubech's transfer to OSC Lille was announced in late July 2017. He spent the 2017–18 season in Lille's lower division reserves squad.

However for the 2018–19 season, Jakubech was, for the most of the games, benched as the replacement keeper for Mike Maignan. Nonetheless, he did not make a competitive appearance for the first time. Despite this fact, he was cited, in October 2018, as happy, in Lille, acknowledging the benefits the training process has on his career and performance. He also claimed, that the move to France caused him some difficult months at the start. Lille went on to finish second in this season, 16 points behind Paris Saint-Germain, but only three ahead of Lyon. Still, they qualified directly to the group stage of the next edition of UEFA Champions League. In 2022, Jakubech's club profile read that he is second or third preferred goalkeeper but had continuously provided professionalism to the club.

International career
Jakubech was first called up for Slovakia's two unofficial friendly fixtures in Abu Dhabi, in January 2017 against Uganda and Sweden. He made his debut against Uganda, when he substituted Michal Šulla in the 46th minute, conceding a goal in 77th minute by Geofrey Massa after a corner kick, which marked the 1–3 defeat. Jakubech did not appear in the 0–6 loss against Sweden later that week.

He was next called up to the squad in October 2018, when Matúš Kozáčik had to withdraw due to an illness. He was called up to the squad, although he was set to prepare with the U21 for UEFA European Under-21 Championship qualification fixtures against Estonia and Northern Ireland, joining Martin Dúbravka and Michal Šulla.

References

External links
 
 Futbalnet profile
 

1997 births
Living people
Sportspeople from Prešov
Association football goalkeepers
Slovak footballers
Slovakia under-21 international footballers
Slovakia youth international footballers
1. FC Tatran Prešov players
FC Spartak Trnava players
Lille OSC players
K.V. Kortrijk players
Slovak Super Liga players
Ligue 1 players
Belgian Pro League players
Slovak expatriate footballers
Expatriate footballers in France
Expatriate footballers in Belgium